The Kauaʻi ʻōʻō or ʻōʻōʻāʻā (Moho braccatus) was the last member of the ʻōʻō (Moho) genus within the Mohoidae family of birds from the islands of Hawaiʻi. The entire family is now extinct. It was previously regarded as a member of the Australo-Pacific honeyeaters (family Meliphagidae). 

The bird was endemic to the island of Kauaʻi. It was common in the subtropical forests of the island until the early twentieth century, when its decline began. It was last seen in 1985, and last heard in 1987. The causes of its extinction include the introduction of predators (such as the Polynesian rat, small Indian mongoose, and the domestic pig), mosquito-borne diseases, and habitat destruction. 

It was the last surviving member of the Mohoidae, which had originated over 15-20 million years prior during the Miocene, with the Kauaʻi ʻōʻō's extinction marking the only extinction of an entire avian family in modern times ("modern" meaning post-1500 AD).

Etymology 
The native Hawaiians named the bird ʻōʻō ʻāʻā, from the Hawaiian word ʻōʻō, an onomatopoeic descriptor from the sound of their call, and ʻāʻā, meaning dwarf.

Description

The head, wings, and tail were black. The rest of the upperparts were slaty brown, becoming rufous on the rump and flanks. The throat and breast was black with white barring, which was particularly prominent in females. The central tail feathers were long, and there was a small tuft of gray feathers under the base of the wing. While the beak and legs were black, the leg feathers were a rich golden yellow. It was the only ʻōʻō known to have eyes with yellow irises. Like other honeyeaters it had a sharp, slightly curved bill for sampling nectar. Its favored nectar sources were Lobelia species and the ʻohiʻa lehua tree. This species was additionally observed foraging in lapalapa trees. It also ate small invertebrates and fruit. The Kauaʻi ʻōʻō was very vocal, making hollow, erratic, flute-like calls. Both the males and females were known to sing.

Extinction
 
The bird was a cavity nester in the thickly forested canyons of Kauaʻi. All of its relatives have also become extinct, such as the Hawaiʻi ʻōʻō, Bishop's ʻōʻō, and Oʻahu ʻōʻō. Relatively little is known about these extinct birds. The species became extinct from a large range of problems, including mosquito-transmitted diseases (which caused the species to retreat to higher ground, ultimately retreating to high-altitude montane forests in the Alakaʻi Wilderness Preserve), introduction of mammalian predators, and deforestation. Higher elevation forests lack tree cavities, so few, if any, nests could be made. As of the early 1960s, the bird had an estimated population of about 34 living individuals. In the 1970s, the only known footage of the bird was filmed by John L. Sincock on Super 8 film and several song recordings were made as well (with Harold Douglas Pratt, Jr. being one of the people involved in recording the songs). In 1981, a pair was found.

The final blow were two hurricanes, Iwa and Iniki, coming within ten years of each other. They destroyed many of the old trees with cavities, and prohibited tree growth when the second one arrived, causing the species to disappear. As a result, the last female bird disappeared (likely killed by Hurricane Iwa). The male bird was last sighted in 1985, and the last sound recording was made in 1987 by David Boynton. After failed expeditions in 1989 and Hurricane Iniki in 1992, the species was declared extinct by the IUCN in 2000. It is still believed by some that the species may survive undetected, as the species had already been proclaimed extinct twice: once in the 1940s (later rediscovered in 1960) and again from the late 1960s to the early 1970s, being rediscovered by the wildlife biologist John Sincock. However, it has a loud and distinctive call, and intensive surveys that occurred from 1989 to 2000 failed to find any.

References

Further reading
 . Chapter 2 of the book is about the ʻōʻō, including the work of John Sincock, who rediscovered the bird in the early 1970s.
 Kauaʻi ʻōʻō
 ML: Macaulay Library
 3D view of specimens RMNH 110.028 and RMNH 110.029 at Naturalis, Leiden (requires QuickTime browser plugin).
 
 Call of Kauaʻi ʻōʻō; Cornell Lab of Ornithology, Macaulay library Kauai Oo Moho Braccatus ML6050 John L. Sincock, June 6, 1975 Alakai Swamp, Kauai Hawaii

External links
A recording of the bird's call. 1975
Archive of Kauaʻi ʻōʻō footage and recordings on Macaulay Library

Extinct birds of Hawaii
Endemic birds of Hawaii
Moho (genus)
Bird extinctions since 1500
Biota of Kauai
Birds described in 1855
Taxa named by John Cassin
ESA endangered species